Hal and Fern Cooper Wildlife Management Area, also known as Cooper WMA, is a  protected area that spans across Woodward and Harper Counties, Oklahoma. The WMA is owned and managed by the Oklahoma Department of Wildlife Conservation (ODWC).

Location
Located Northeast of Fort Supply and adjacent to the  Fort Supply WMA. Beaver River joins Wolf Creek to form the North Canadian River within the WMA.

History
According to ODWC deputy director Charles Wallace the Coopers had spent many years building a successful ranch and wanted it to be kept together and enjoyed by others. In 1992 Mrs. Cooper donated 2,498.68 acres and the state of Oklahoma purchased the rest, agreeing to continue to pay the ad valorem taxes so the counties would not lose revenue.

Description
The WMA contains mixed prairie grass and sagebrush is found on the upland sites interspersed with sand plum thickets.  of river bottom contains cottonwood, American elm, hackberry and eastern red cedar interspersed with sand plum thickets, salt cedar and mixed grassland. Wildlife includes pheasant, quail dove, duck, geese, deer, turkey, rabbits (cottontails and jackrabbits), coyote, bobcat and raccoons. Bald Eagles winter on Fort Supply WMA and have been seen on Cooper WMA.

See also
List of Oklahoma Wildlife Management Areas

References

Protected areas of Oklahoma
Geography of Woodward County, Oklahoma

Geography of Harper County, Oklahoma